The Bridge Street historic district is the smaller of two that make up the downtown area of the village of Montgomery in Orange County, New York. It is located along Bridge Street, just off NY 17K as it enters the village by crossing the Wallkill River at Ward's Bridge, hence its name. The Union Street-Academy Hill Historic District is located immediately to the southeast.

The district is primarily residential. Its 28 houses are generally older than their counterparts in the larger district, with the oldest dating to 1792. It was added to the National Register of Historic Places in 1980.

References

National Register of Historic Places in Orange County, New York
Historic districts on the National Register of Historic Places in New York (state)
Historic districts in Orange County, New York